The Brown Book of the Reichstag Fire and Hitler Terror (German: Braunbuch über Reichstagsbrand und Hitlerterror) is a book published in Paris, France in August 1933 and written by an anti-fascist group including German communist Willi Munzenberg, Hans Siemsen and Gustav Regler. It put forth the theory that Nazis were behind the Reichstag fire of February 27, 1933. According to Munoz  it was one of the best selling books of all time.

That book claimed that Ernst Röhm's assistant , who was murdered in early 1933 in Austria, had been his pimp and had procured Reichstag arsonist Marinus van der Lubbe for Röhm. The book claimed that a clique of homosexual stormtroopers led by Heines set the Reichstag fire; van der Lubbe remained behind and agreed to accept the sole blame because of his desperation for affection; Bell was killed to cover it up. There was no evidence for these claims, and in fact Heines was several hundred kilometers away at the time. Nevertheless, the matter was so politically explosive that it was aired at van der Lubbe's trial in Leipzig. Wackerfuss states that Reichstag conspiracy appealed to antifascists because of their preexisting belief that "the heart of the Nazis' militant nationalist politics lay in the sinister schemes of decadent homosexual criminals".

The book's cover was designed by John Heartfield. The book was published in English in Great Britain in September 1933 with a foreword by Dudley Aman, 1st Baron Marley.

References

External links 
 Staging Antifascism: The Brown Book of the Reichstag Fire and Hitler Terror, by Anson Rabinbach
 The Reichstag Fire Trial, 1933-2008: The Production of Law and History
 The Brown Book of the Hitler Terror and the Burning of the Reichstag A HathiTrust full text of the US edition held by the University of Michigan: Alfred A Knopf Inc, NY, 1933.
 

1933 non-fiction books
Books about Nazism
French books
Propaganda books and pamphlets
Conspiracy theories